"Super Freaky Girl" is a song by rapper Nicki Minaj, released on August 12, 2022, by Young Money Entertainment and Republic Records. It is an upbeat, raunchy song that samples Rick James's 1981 single "Super Freak", as Minaj raps about her sexual fantasies and endeavors, while also boasting about her career. It received comparisons to Minaj's 2014 single "Anaconda", as both tracks feature classic samples and sexual lyrics.

Upon its release, the song broke the Spotify record for the biggest debut for a solo female rap song. The song debuted at number one on the US Billboard Hot 100, which marked the third US number-one single of Minaj's career as well as her first number-one song as a solo artist. Internationally, the song has topped the charts in Australia and New Zealand, becoming Minaj's first number-one single in both countries. The song also reached the top ten in multiple other countries including Canada, Hungary, Iceland, Ireland, Philippines, France, South Africa, and the United Kingdom. The song received a nomination for Song of Summer at the 2022 VMAs.

An extended version of the song, called the 'Roman Remix', was surprise-released on August 18, 2022, whereby Minaj incorporates her alter ego Roman Zolanski for a third verse on the track. On September 9, 2022, a second remix titled 'Queen Mix' was released featuring multiple female rappers including JT of City Girls, BIA, Katie Got Bandz, Akbar V, and Maliibu Miitch. The original version of the song is included on Minaj's first greatest hits album Queen Radio: Volume 1 (2022).

Background and release
On July 13, 2022, Minaj previewed a song titled "Freaky Girl" on her social media. The official Twitter account of Rick James, whom the song samples, responded to the snippet, calling it a "banger." Minaj had asked fans to choose the song's official title, ultimately settling on "Super Freaky Girl", explaining that due to unspecified legal issues, she could not use either "Freaky Girl" or "Freak", the latter having won a fan-voted poll. On July 22, she announced that the song would be released on August 12.

On August 5, she revealed the cover art for the song, alongside a thirst trap. The song's snippet garnered popularity on TikTok and its release was noted for being highly anticipated. The song was premiered on Minaj's Amazon Amp Queen Radio show on August 11. Its release was accompanied by an eggplant and peach emoji-filled lyric video. "Super Freaky Girl" is the second time Minaj sampled "Super Freak", after using it on "Dilly Dally", a track from her 2007 mixtape Playtime Is Over.

The song marked Minaj's first solo release since "Megatron" in 2019. The song was deemed as "a return to form" for Minaj after she said in February 2022 on The Dana Cortez Show that she felt uncomfortable releasing vulgar music while pregnant with her son, explaining that she was in different space at the time: "My label wanted me to go full out with a single and everything when I was pregnant, and I couldn't bring myself to put out a song about pussy and dicks and sucking and eating. I couldn't bring myself to put a record out like that while my son was growing in my body".

Billboard noted that Minaj was the only artist in 2022, out of all artists who took the Recording Academy’s Women in the Mix pledge, to work with a woman producer (Malibu Babie) on a song that appeared on the Billboard Hot 100 Year-End Chart.

Composition
"Super Freaky Girl" is a raunchy, sensual song, featuring Minaj's new alter ego Nick James, named after Rick James. The song sees Minaj describing her sexual encounters in a vivid manner, while "reiterating her status as a rap icon, as well as a symbol of sexual liberation". A bass-heavy song, it prominently samples Rick James's "Super Freak" (1981), particularly the riff, and opens with James's a capella vocals.

Minaj interpolates her 2013 remix of PTAF's "Boss Ass Bitch", while referencing, among others, Master P's 1998 single "Make 'Em Say Uhh!", former NFL player Colin Kaepernick's "take a knee" protests, and playing on the names of Rihanna and ASAP Rocky, rapping "Get me Rocky A$AP, nigga, word to Rih". The song has been compared to Minaj's 2014 single "Anaconda".

Critical reception
"Super Freaky Girl" was met with generally positive reviews from critics. Shaad D'Souza of Paper called the song "a bouncy, bawdy return to pop-rap. Zany and addictive, you can think of it as 'Anaconda 2'. David Renshaw of The Fader praised Minaj for bringing "her A-game to the song, spitting x-rated bars and confident boosting mottos ('I got a princess face, a killer body, samurai mind'), making it a natural sister track to her own 'Anaconda'. Complexs Jessica McKinney listed the song among the best releases of the week, saying on "Freaky Girl", Minaj is "confident, sexy, and alluring, leaving us wanting more", while calling her "flow irresistible on the song, as she takes pride in her freaky nature and vividly describes her sexual encounters".

Claire Yotts of Our Generation Music said "The 39-year-old and mother of one is still killing the game as 'Super Freaky Girl' is a reminder to all why she is known as the Queen of Rap". Billboards Mitchell Peters said Minaj "has a gleeful time reanimating the classic track's salacious funk with sexual innuendo and a flow that knows when to speed up and when to really land a punchline". In a negative review, The Daily Beasts Coleman Spilde called the song "awful", writing: "To say the song adds nothing of value to Minaj's career is a wild and vast understatement. The bars are flat, the punchlines could've been written by a Nicki Minaj AI, and the Rick James sample is doing all the heavy lifting". Spilde also criticized Minaj for working with co-producer Dr. Luke, who faced sexual assault allegations in the past.

Controversy
Upon voting consideration for the 65th Annual Grammy Awards, "Super Freaky Girl" had reportedly been placed in the pop categories instead of the rap categories. Minaj, later that day, went on Instagram Live to express her confusion and frustration on the subject. By way of comparison, Minaj mentioned Latto's 2021 song "Big Energy" being potentially considered for the rap categories, saying that if her single is not being qualified as a rap song, neither should be Latto's. Minaj, shortly after ending the live video, went on Twitter to express more information, citing how "U Can't Touch This" by MC Hammer, which also sampled "Super Freak", was nominated for the rap categories. "Super Freaky Girl" eventually received no Grammy Award nominations as Nicki Minaj had been reported to have withdrawn from the institution.

Awards and nominations

Commercial performance

Worldwide
Following its release, "Super Freaky Girl" earned the biggest debut for a solo female rap song in Spotify history, garnering over three million streams. It also became the fastest solo female rap song to surpass 100 and 200 million streams on Spotify On the Billboard Global 200 , the song debuted at number five, simultaneously earning Minaj her second top ten entry on the chart as well as her highest-charting single there, surpassing the number seven peak of "Do We Have a Problem?".

North America
In the United States, "Super Freaky Girl" debuted at the top of the Billboard Hot 100 for the chart dated August 27, 2022, making it Minaj's third number one song on the chart and her first unaccompanied by another featured artist. She became the first Black female artist to debut at the top of the chart with a solo song since Fantasia's "I Believe" in 2004 and the fifth Black female artist to ever do so. Minaj became the first solo female rapper to debut at the summit of the Hot 100 since Lauryn Hill's "Doo Wop (That Thing)" in 1998 and first female rapper to debut a solo song at number one in the 21st century. "Super Freaky Girl" extended Minaj's record as the female rapper with the most top 10 entries on the Hot 100 with 21 and the female rapper with the most entries on the chart with 124. She became the first female artist to debut atop the chart without an accompanying music video since Ariana Grande's "Thank U, Next" in 2018.  It became the first time in the 21st century that three black female artists reached number one on the Hot 100 consecutively, following Lizzo's "About Damn Time", Beyoncé's "Break My Soul", and Minaj's own "Super Freaky Girl". The debut of "Super Freaky Girl" resulted in Minaj re-entering Billboards Artist 100 chart at number three for the issue ending August 27, 2022, becoming the highest charting female artist that week.

The song debuted atop both Billboards Digital Songs Sales and Streaming Songs charts, powered by strong sales figures of 89,000 digital downloads sold, as well as a total of 21.1 million US streams garnered within its first week of availability from August 12 to 18. With 89,000 downloads sold, "Super Freaky Girl" marked the largest digital sales week for any song in 2022, surpassing Minaj's own "Do We Have a Problem?" with Lil Baby. It became her twelfth and second leader on both of the aforementioned charts, respectively. The song missed entering Billboards Radio Songs chart in its first week, drawing 4.6 million all-format radio audience impressions in the week ending August 21 due to early airplay. "Super Freaky Girl" entered at the summit of both the Hot R&B/Hip-Hop Songs and Hot Rap Songs, at number one, becoming her eighth leader on both charts, respectively.

In its second week, "Super Freaky Girl" remained within the Billboard Hot 100's top ten, placing at number seven. The song sold another 15,000 digital downloads, spending a second consecutive week atop the Digital Songs Sales chart, while slipping 1–3 on the Streaming Songs chart with an additional 18.1 million US streams, down 14 percent from its first week. Despite this, "Super Freaky Girl" marked Minaj's first multi-week chart topper on the Digital Songs of her career. The track drew in 9.2 million radio audience impressions, a 105% increase from the previous week, causing it to jump to number 27 on Billboard'''s Mainstream Top 40 chart following its number 34 debut. The song has spent eleven weeks atop the Hot Rap Songs chart, and has peaked at numbers one and four on the Rhythmic Songs and Mainstream Top 40 airplay charts respectively, becoming her tenth top ten hit at the former and her first since 2016. The song has sold over 2 million units in the United States as of January 2023.

In Canada, "Super Freaky Girl" arrived at number eight on the Canadian Hot 100 chart, earning the title as the highest new entry of the week. It gave Minaj her nineteenth top ten single in the nation, while debuting atop the Canadian Digital Songs chart, earning Minaj her fifth sales chart topper and twenty-fourth top ten entry there.

Europe and Oceania 
Across Europe the song achieved commercial success. In Ireland, "Super Freaky Girl" debuted at number 14 on the Irish Singles Chart weekly issue ending August 25, 2022, before ascending to number nine in its second week. It later peaked at number six in its fifth week. Similarly, it charted at number 15 in its opening week in the United Kingdom. It ascended to number ten on the week ending September 1, 2022, before slipping one position to number 11 in its third week.

In its fifth week, the track reached a new peak of number five, becoming Minaj's highest-charting entry as lead artist since "Anaconda" reached number three in 2014, as well as highest overall peak since "Boyz" peaked at number four in October 2021. The song charted at number four on the UK R&B Chart in its first week, where it has reached a peak of number one on the chart issue dated September 9, 2022.

In Australia, "Super Freaky Girl" debuted at number four on the ARIA Singles Chart for the week dated August 22, 2022, becoming her first song to enter the top 10 as a lead artist since her 2014 single, "Bed of Lies". The song ascended to number one in its fourth week on the chart, becoming Minaj's first number-one song and the first solo female rap song to go number one in the country. In New Zealand, the track debuted at number five on the New Zealand Singles Chart, ascending to the top spot in its second week, becoming her first number-one hit in the nation. It has stayed atop the chart for five consecutive weeks.

Music video
On August 18, 2022, Minaj previewed the official music video. It features her as a housewife in a setting similar to Wisteria Lane, as she unleashes her "freaky" secrets, donning long pink hair, sitting on top of the kitchen counter, wielding a knife over her lover. She also opens a drawer filled with freaky accessories. On September 1, 2022, Minaj officially released the music video to "Super Freaky Girl" with Alexander Ludwig, starring as the Barbie character, Ken.

Remixes
On August 18, 2022, Minaj released an extended version of "Super Freaky Girl", dubbed the "Roman Remix", featuring her alter ego Roman Zolanski. This marked a return of the alter ego. The song is a minute longer than the original, and has a restructured end, adding a third verse. HotNewHipHops Aron A. called it a "double-timed fiery" verse, while Regina Cho of Revolt and Uproxxs Aaron Williams likewise both said Minaj delivers a "rapid-fire verse". Noting the boasts about her career's longevity, Williams said "It's an especially timely assertion, considering she's soon to be honored with a Video Vanguard Award at the upcoming 2022 VMAs". Minaj also mentions how an old mixtape of hers sold more than someone's album, likely a reference to her 2021 re-release of her 2009 mixtape Beam Me Up Scotty'', which debuted at number two on the Billboard 200. She also shouts out label-mates Lil Wayne and Drake.

On September 9, 2022, Minaj released a second remix dubbed the "Queen Mix", featuring American female rappers JT from City Girls, Bia, Katie Got Bandz, Akbar V, and Maliibu Miitch.

Charts

Weekly charts

Year-end charts

Certifications

Release history

References

2022 songs
2022 singles
Billboard Hot 100 number-one singles
Nicki Minaj songs
Number-one singles in Australia
Number-one singles in New Zealand
Songs written by Nicki Minaj
Songs written by LunchMoney Lewis
Songs written by Rick James
Song recordings produced by Dr. Luke
Republic Records singles
Young Money Entertainment singles
Music videos directed by Joseph Kahn